The Lutheran High School Association of Greater Detroit (or simply Lutheran High School Association) is an association of several Lutheran high schools in Metro Detroit, Michigan.  It has a unified standards-based curriculum.  Currently its component high schools are Lutheran High School North, Lutheran High School Westland, and Lutheran High School Northwest. The Lutheran High School Association administrative office relocated to an addition at Lutheran Northwest in 2006.

List of schools

Former

References

External links
Lutheran High School Association, official website

Lutheran schools in Michigan
High schools in Michigan
Lutheran organizations established in the 20th century
Michigan